The Muslim conquest of Persia, also known as the Arab conquest of Iran, was carried out by the Rashidun Caliphate from 633 to 654 AD and led to the fall of the Sasanian Empire as well as the eventual decline of the Zoroastrian religion.

The rise of the Muslims in Arabia coincided with an unprecedented political, social, economic, and military weakness in Persia. Once a major world power, the Sasanian Empire had exhausted its human and material resources after decades of warfare against the Byzantine Empire. The Sasanian state's internal political situation quickly deteriorated after the execution of King Khosrow II in 628. Subsequently, ten new claimants were enthroned within the next four years. Following the Sasanian civil war of 628–632, the empire was no longer centralized.

Arab Muslims first attacked Sasanian territory in 633, when Khalid ibn al-Walid invaded Mesopotamia (then known as the Sasanian province of Asōristān; roughly corresponding to modern-day Iraq), which was the political and economic centre of the Sasanian state. Following the transfer of Khalid to the Byzantine front in the Levant, the Muslims eventually lost their holdings to Sasanian counterattacks. The second Muslim invasion began in 636, under Sa'd ibn Abi Waqqas, when a key victory at the Battle of al-Qadisiyyah led to the permanent end of Sasanian control west of modern-day Iran. For the next six years, the Zagros Mountains, a natural barrier, marked the border between the Rashidun Caliphate and the Sasanian Empire. In 642, Umar ibn al-Khattab, then-Caliph of the Muslims, ordered a full-scale invasion of Persia by the Rashidun army, which led to the complete conquest of the Sasanian Empire by 651. Directing from Medina, a few thousand kilometres away, Umar's quick conquest of Persia in a series of well-coordinated, multi-pronged attacks became his greatest triumph, contributing to his reputation as a great military and political strategist. In 644, prior to the complete annexation of Persia by the Arab Muslims, Umar was assassinated by Abu Lu'lu'a Firuz, a Persian craftsman who was captured in battle and brought to Arabia as a slave.

Some Iranian historians have defended their forebears using Arab sources to illustrate that "contrary to the claims of some historians, Iranians, in fact, fought long and hard against the invading Arabs." By 651, most of the urban centres in Iranian lands, with the notable exception of the Caspian provinces (Tabaristan and Transoxiana), had come under the domination of Arab Muslim forces. Many localities fought against the invaders; although Arabs had established hegemony over most of the country, many cities rose in rebellion by killing their Arab governors or attacking their garrisons. Eventually, Arab military reinforcements quashed the Iranian insurgencies and imposed complete Islamic control. The Islamization of Iran was gradual and incentivized in various ways over a period of centuries with some Iranians never converting and widespread cases of Zoroastrian scriptures being burnt and priests being executed, particularly in areas that experienced violent resistance. The Persians began to reassert themselves by maintaining the Persian language and Iranian culture. Islam became the dominant religion in Iran by the late Middle Ages.

Historiography and recent scholarship

When Western academics first investigated the Muslim conquest of Persia, they relied solely on the accounts of the Armenian Christian bishop Sebeos, and accounts in Arabic written some time after the events they describe. The most significant work was probably that of Arthur Christensen, and his L’Iran sous les Sassanides, published in Copenhagen and Paris in 1944.

Recent scholarship has begun to question the traditional narrative: Parvaneh Pourshariati, in her Decline and Fall of the Sasanian Empire: The Sasanian-Parthian Confederacy and the Arab Conquest of Iran, published in 2008, provides both a detailed overview of the problematic nature of trying to establish exactly what happened, and a great deal of original research that questions fundamental facts of the traditional narrative, including the timeline and specific dates.

Pourshariati's central thesis is that contrary to what was commonly assumed, the Sassanian Empire was highly decentralized, and was in fact a "confederation" with the Parthians, who themselves retained a high level of independence. Despite their recent victories over the Byzantine Empire, the Parthians unexpectedly withdrew from the confederation, and the Sassanians were thus ill-prepared and ill-equipped to mount an effective and cohesive defense against the Muslim armies. Moreover, the powerful northern and eastern Parthian families, the kust-i khwarasan and kust-i adurbadagan, withdrew to their respective strongholds and made peace with the Arabs, refusing to fight alongside the Sassanians.

Another important theme of Pourshariati's study is a re-evaluation of the traditional timeline. Pourshariati argues that the Arab conquest of Mesopotamia "took place, not, as has been conventionally believed, in the years 632–634, after the accession of the last Sasanian king Yazdgerd III (632–651) to power, but in the period from 628 to 632." An important consequence of this change in timeline means that the Arab conquest started precisely when the Sassanians and Parthians were engaged in internecine warfare over succession to the Sassanian throne.

Sasanian Empire before the conquest
Since the 1st century BC, the border between the Roman (later Byzantine) and Parthian (later Sasanian) empires had been the Euphrates River. The border was constantly contested. Most battles, and thus most fortifications, were concentrated in the hilly regions of the north, as the vast Arabian or Syrian Desert (Roman Arabia) separated the rival empires in the south. The only dangers expected from the south were occasional raids by nomadic Arab tribesmen. Both empires therefore allied themselves with small, semi-independent Arab principalities, which served as buffer states and protected Byzantium and Persia from Bedouin attacks. The Byzantine clients were the Ghassanids; the Persian clients were the Lakhmids. The Ghassanids and Lakhmids feuded constantly, which kept them occupied, but that did not greatly affect the Byzantines or the Persians. In the 6th and 7th centuries, various factors destroyed the balance of power that had held for so many centuries.

The conflict with the Byzantines greatly contributed to its weakness, by draining Sassanid resources, leaving it a prime target for the Muslims.

Social problems
Sasanian society was divided into four classes: priests, warriors, secretaries, and commoners. The latter formed the bulk of the population, served as its sole tax base, and remained its poorest class.

At the climax of Khosrau II's ambitious Byzantine territory conquests in the Levant and much of Asia Minor, taxes rose dramatically, and most people could not pay. Years of Sassanid-Byzantine wars had ruined trade routes and industry, the population's main income sources. The existing Sassanid administrative structure proved inadequate when faced with the combined demands of a suddenly expanded empire, economy, and population. Rapid turnover of rulers and increasing provincial landholder (dehqan) power further diminished the Sasanians. Over a period of fourteen years and twelve successive kings, the Sassanid Empire weakened considerably, and the power of the central authority passed into the hands of its generals. Even when a strong king emerged following a series of coups, the Sassanids never completely recovered.

Events

Revolt of the Arab client states (602)

The Byzantine clients, the Arab Ghassanids, converted to the Monophysite form of Christianity, which was regarded as heretical by the established Byzantine Eastern Orthodox Church. The Byzantines attempted to suppress the heresy, alienating the Ghassanids and sparking rebellions on their desert frontiers. The Lakhmids also revolted against the Persian king Khusrau II. Nu'man III (son of Al-Monder IV), the first Christian Lakhmid king, was deposed and killed by Khusrau II in 602, because of his attempt to throw off Persian suzerainty. After Khusrau's assassination in 628, the Persian Empire fractured and the Lakhmids were effectively semi-independent. It is now widely believed that the annexation of the Lakhmid kingdom was one of the main factors behind the fall of the Sasanian Empire and the subsequent Islamic conquest of Persia, as the Lakhmids agreed to act as spies for the Muslims after being defeated in the Battle of Hira by Khalid ibn al-Walid.

Byzantine–Sassanid War (602–628)

The Persian ruler Khosrau II (Parviz) defeated a dangerous rebellion within his own empire, Bahram Chobin's rebellion. He then turned his focus to his traditional Byzantine enemies, leading to the Byzantine-Sassanid War of 602–628. For a few years, he succeeded. From 612 to 622, he extended the Persian borders almost to the same extent that they were under the Achaemenid dynasty (550–330 BC), capturing Western states as far as Egypt, Palestine (the conquest of the latter being assisted by a Jewish army), and more.

The Byzantines regrouped and pushed back in 622 under Heraclius. Khosrau was defeated at the Battle of Nineveh in 627, and the Byzantines recaptured all of Syria and penetrated far into the Persian provinces of Mesopotamia. In 629, Khosrau's general Shahrbaraz agreed to peace, and the border between the two empires was once again the same as it had been in 602.

Plague of Sheroe

The Plague of Sheroe (627–628) was one of several epidemics that occurred in or close to Iran within two centuries after the first epidemic was brought by the Sasanian armies from its campaigns in Constantinople, Syria, and Armenia. It contributed to the fall of the Sasanian Empire.

Execution of Khosrau II

Khosrau II was executed in 628 and, as a result, there were numerous claimants to the throne; from 628 to 632 there were ten kings and queens of Persia. The last, Yazdegerd III, was a grandson of Khosrau II and was said to be a mere child aged 8 years.

Muhammad's Letter
After the Treaty of Hudaybiyyah in 628, Islamic tradition holds that Muhammad sent many letters to the princes, kings, and chiefs of the various tribes and kingdoms of the time, exhorting them to convert to Islam and bow to the order of God. These letters were carried by ambassadors to Persia, Byzantium, Ethiopia, Egypt, Yemen, and Hira (Iraq) on the same day. This assertion has been brought under scrutiny by some modern historians of Islam—notably Grimme and Caetani. Particularly in dispute is the assertion that Khosrau II received a letter from Muhammad, as the Sassanid court ceremony was notoriously intricate, and it is unlikely that a letter from what at the time was a minor regional power would have reached the hands of the Shahanshah.

With regards to Persia, Muslim histories further recount that at the beginning of the seventh year of migration, Muhammad appointed one of his officers, Abdullah Huzafah Sahmi Qarashi, to carry his letter to Khosrau II inviting him to convert:

There are differing accounts of the reaction of Khosrau II.

Military

Years of warfare between the Sasanians and the Byzantines, as well as the strain of the Khazar invasion of Transcaucasia, had exhausted the army. No effective ruler followed Khosrau II, causing chaos in society and problems in the provincial administration, until Yazdegerd III rose to power. All these factors undermined the strength of the Persian army. Yazdegerd III was merely 8 years old when he came to the throne and, lacking experience, did not try to rebuild the army. The Sasanian Empire was highly decentralized, and was in fact a "confederation" with the Parthians, who themselves retained a high level of independence. After the last Sasanian-Byzantine war, the Parthians wanted to withdraw from the confederation, and the Sasanians were thus ill-prepared and ill-equipped to mount an effective and cohesive defense against the Muslim armies. Moreover, the powerful northern and eastern Parthian families, the Kust-i Khwarasan and Kust-i Adurbadagan, withdrew to their respective strongholds and made peace with the Arabs, refusing to fight alongside the Sasanians.

Pourshariati argues that the Arab conquest of Mesopotamia "took place, not, as has been conventionally believed, in the years 632–634, after the accession of the last Sasanian king Yazdgerd III (632–651) to power, but in the period from 628 to 632." An important consequence of this change in timeline means that the Arab conquest started precisely when the Sasanians and Parthians were engaged in internecine warfare over who was to succeed the Sasanian throne.

When Arab squadrons made their first raids into Sasanian territory, Yazdegerd III did not consider them a threat, and he refused to send an army to encounter the invaders. When the main Arab army reached the Persian borders, Yazdegerd III procrastinated in dispatching an army against the Arabs. Even Rostam-e Farokhzad, who was both Eran Spahbod and Viceroy, did not see the Arabs as a threat. Without opposition, the Arabs had time to consolidate and fortify their positions.

When hostilities between the Sasanians and the Arabs finally began, the Persian army faced fundamental problems. While their heavy cavalry had proved effective against the Roman forces, it was too slow and regimented to act with full force against the agile and unpredictable lightly armed Arab cavalry and foot archers.

The Persian army had a few initial successes. War elephants temporarily stopped the Arab army, but when Arab veterans returned from the Syrian fronts where they had been fighting against Byzantine armies, they taught the Arab army how to deal with these beasts.

These factors contributed to the decisive Sassanid defeat at the Battle of al-Qādisiyyah. The Persians, who had only one generation before conquered Egypt and Asia Minor, lost decisive battles when nimble, lightly armed Arabs accustomed to skirmishes and desert warfare attacked them. The Arab squadrons defeated the Persian army in several more battles culminating in the Battle of Nahāvand, the last major battle of the Sassanids. The Sassanid dynasty came to an end with the death of Yazdegerd III in 651.

Rise of the Caliphate
Muhammad died in June 632, and Abu Bakr took the title of Caliph and political successor at Medina. Soon after Abu Bakr's succession, several Arab tribes revolted, in the Ridda Wars (Arabic for the Wars of Apostasy). The Ridda Wars preoccupied the Caliphate until March 633, and ended with the entirety of the Arab Peninsula under the authority of the Caliph at Medina.

Abu Bakr set in motion a historical trajectory (continued later by Umar and Uthman) that in a few decades led to one of the largest empires in history, beginning with a confrontation with the Sassanid Empire under the general Khalid ibn al-Walid.

First invasion of Mesopotamia (633)

After the Ridda wars, a tribal chief of northeastern Arabia, Al-Muthanna ibn Haritha, raided the Sasanian towns in Mesopotamia (modern-day Iraq). Abu Bakr was strong enough to attack the Persian Empire in the north-east and the Byzantine Empire in the north-west. There were three purposes for this conquest. First, along the border between Arabia and these two great empires were numerous nomadic Arab tribes serving as a buffer between the Persians and Romans. Abu Bakr hoped that these tribes might accept Islam and help their brethren in spreading it. Second, the Persian and Roman populations were very highly taxed; Abu Bakr believed that they might be persuaded to help the Muslims, who agreed to release them from the excessive tributes. Finally, Abu Bakr hoped that by attacking Iraq and Syria he might remove the danger from the borders of the Islamic State. With the success of the raids, a considerable amount of booty was collected. Al-Muthanna ibn Haritha went to Medina to inform Abu Bakr about his success and was appointed commander of his people, after which he began to raid deeper into Mesopotamia. Using the mobility of his light cavalry, he could easily raid any town near the desert and disappear again into the desert, beyond the reach of the Sasanian army. Al-Muthanna's acts made Abu Bakr think about the expansion of the Rashidun Caliphate.

To ensure victory, Abu Bakr used a volunteer army and put his best general, Khalid ibn al-Walid, in command. After defeating the self-proclaimed prophet Musaylimah in the Battle of Yamama, Khalid was still at Al-Yamama when Abu Bakr ordered him to invade the Sasanian Empire. Making Al-Hirah the objective of Khalid, Abu Bakr sent reinforcements and ordered the tribal chiefs of northeastern Arabia, Al-Muthanna ibn Haritha, Mazhur bin Adi, Harmala and Sulma to operate under Khalid's command. Around the third week of March 633 (first week of Muharram 12th Hijrah) Khalid set out from Al-Yamama with an army of 10,000. The tribal chiefs, with 2,000 warriors each, joined him, swelling his ranks to 18,000.

After entering Mesopotamia, he dispatched messages to every governor and deputy who ruled the provinces. The messages said; “In the Name of God, the Most Compassionate and Merciful. Khalid ibn Walid sends this message to the satraps of Persia. Peace will be upon him who follows the guidance. All praise and thanks be to God who disperses your power and thwarted your deceitful plots. On the one hand, he who performs our prayers facing the direction of our Qiblah to face the sacred Mosque in Mekkah and eats our slaughtered animals is a Muslim. He has the same rights and duties that we have. On the other hand, if you do not want to embrace Islam, then as soon as you receive this message, send over the jizya and I give you my word that I will respect and honor this covenant. But if you do not agree to either choice, then, by God, I will send to you people who crave death as much as you crave life.”  Khalid did not receive any responses and continued with his tactical plans.

Khalid won decisive victories in four consecutive battles: the Battle of Chains, fought in April; the Battle of River, fought in the third week of April; the Battle of Walaja the following month (where he successfully used a double envelopment manoeuvre), and the Battle of Ullais, fought in mid-May. The Persian court, already disturbed by internal problems, was thrown into chaos. In the last week of May, the important city of Hira fell to the Muslims. After resting his armies, in June, Khalid laid siege to the city of al-Anbar, which surrendered in July. Khalid then moved south, and conquered the city of Ayn al-Tamr in the last week of July. At this point, most of what is now Iraq was under Islamic control.

Khalid received a call for aid from northern Arabia at Dawmat al-Jandal, where another Muslim Arab general, Iyad ibn Ghanm, was trapped among the rebel tribes. Khalid went there and defeated the rebels in the Battle of Dawmat al-Jandal in the last week of August. Upon his return, he received news of the assembling of a large Persian army. He decided to defeat them all separately to avoid the risk of being defeated by a large unified Persian army. Four divisions of Persian and Christian Arab auxiliaries were present at Hanafiz, Zumiel, Sanni and Muzieh. Khalid divided his army into three units, and employed them in well-coordinated attacks against the Persians from three different sides at night, in the Battle of Muzayyah, then the Battle of Saniyy, and finally the Battle of Zumail, all during the month of November. These devastating defeats ended Persian control over Mesopotamia, and left the Persian capital Ctesiphon vulnerable. Before attacking Ctesiphon, Khalid decided to eliminate all Persian forces in the south and west. He accordingly marched against the border city of Firaz, where he defeated the combined forces of the Sasanian Persians, the Byzantines and Christian Arabs in December. This was the last battle in his conquest of Mesopotamia. While Khalid was on his way to attack Qadissiyah (a key fort en route to Ctesiphon), Abu Bakr ordered him to the Roman front in Syria to assume command there.

Second invasion of Mesopotamia (634–636)

Battle of the Bridge

According to the will of Abu Bakr, Umar was to continue the conquest of Syria and Mesopotamia. On the northeastern borders of the Empire, in Mesopotamia, the situation was rapidly deteriorating. During Abu Bakr's era, Khalid ibn al-Walid had left Mesopotamia with half his army of 9000 soldiers to assume command in Syria, whereupon the Persians decided to take back their lost territory. The Muslim army was forced to leave the conquered areas and concentrate on the border. Umar immediately sent reinforcements to aid Muthanna ibn Haritha in Mesopotamia under the command of Abu Ubaid al-Thaqafi. At that time, a series of battles between the Persians and Arabs occurred in the region of Sawad, such as Namaraq, Kaskar and Baqusiatha, in which the Arabs managed to maintain their presence in the area. Later on, the Persians defeated Abu Ubaid in the Battle of the Bridge. Muthanna bin Haritha was later victorious in the Battle of Buwayb. In 635 Yazdgerd III sought an alliance with Emperor Heraclius of the Eastern Roman Empire, marrying the latter's daughter (or, by some traditions, his granddaughter) in order to seal the arrangement. While Heraclius prepared for a major offence in the Levant, Yazdegerd ordered the concentration of massive armies to push the Muslims out of Mesopotamia for good through a series of well-coordinated attacks on two fronts.

Battle of Qadisiyyah

Umar ordered his army to retreat to the Arabian border and began raising armies at Medina for another campaign into Mesopotamia. Owing to the critical situation, Umar wished to command the army personally, but the members of Majlis ash-Shura demurred, claiming that the two-front war required Umar's presence in Medina. Accordingly, Umar appointed Saad ibn Abi Waqqas, a respected senior officer, even though Saad was suffering from sciatica. Saad left Medina with his army in May 636 and arrived at Qadisiyyah in June.

While Heraclius launched his offensive in May 636, Yazdegerd was unable to muster his armies in time to provide the Byzantines with Persian support. Umar, allegedly aware of this alliance and not wanting to risk a battle with two great powers simultaneously, quickly reinforced the Muslim army at Yarmouk to engage and defeat the Byzantines. Meanwhile, he ordered Saad to enter into peace negotiations with Yazdegerd III and invite him to convert to Islam to prevent Persian forces from taking the field. Heraclius instructed his general Vahan not to engage in battle with the Muslims before receiving explicit orders. Fearing more Arab reinforcements, Vahan attacked the Muslim army in the Battle of Yarmouk in August 636, and was routed.

With the Byzantine threat ended, the Sasanian Empire was still a formidable power with vast manpower reserves, and the Arabs soon found themselves confronting a huge Persian army with troops drawn from every corner of the empire, including war elephants, and commanded by its foremost generals. Within three months, Saad defeated the Persian army in the Battle of al-Qādisiyyah, effectively ending Sasanian rule west of Persia proper. This victory is largely regarded as a decisive turning point in Islam's growth: with the bulk of Persian forces defeated, Saad with his companions later conquered Babylon (Battle of Babylon (636)), Kūthā, Sābāṭ (Valashabad) and Bahurasīr (Veh-Ardashir). Ctesiphon, the capital of the Sassanid Empire, fell in March 637 after a siege of three months.

Conquest of Mesopotamia (636–638)
In December 636, Umar ordered Utbah ibn Ghazwan to head south to capture al-Ubulla (known as "port of Apologos" in the Periplus of the Erythraean Sea) and Basra, in order to cut ties between the Persian garrison there and Ctesiphon. Utbah ibn Ghazwan arrived in April 637, and captured the region. The Persians withdrew to the Maysan region, which the Muslims seized later as well.

After the conquest of Ctesiphon, several detachments were immediately sent west to capture Circesium and Heet, both forts at the Byzantine border. Several fortified Persian armies were still active north-east of Ctesiphon at Jalawla and north of the Tigris at Tikrit and Mosul.

After withdrawal from Ctesiphon, the Persian armies gathered at Jalawla, a place of strategic importance due to routes leading from here to Mesopotamia, Khurasan and Azerbaijan. The Persian forces at Jalawla were commanded by Mihran. His deputy was Farrukhzad, a brother of Rustam, who had commanded the Persian forces at the Battle of al-Qadisiyyah. Umar decided to deal with Jalawla first, thereby clearing the way to the north, before taking any decisive action against Tikrit and Mosul. Umar appointed Hashim ibn Utbah to take Jalawla and Abdullah ibn Muta'am to conquer Tikrit and Mosul. In April 637, Hashim led 12,000 troops from Ctesiphon to win a victory over the Persians at the Battle of Jalawla. He then laid siege to Jalawla for seven months, ending in the city's capture. Then, Abdullah ibn Muta'am marched against Tikrit and captured the city with the help of Christians, after fierce resistance.  He next sent an army to Mosul which surrendered on the condition of paying Jizya. With victory at Jalawla and occupation of the Tikrit-Mosul region, the whole of Mesopotamia was under Muslim control.

Thereafter, a Muslim force under Qa'qa marched in pursuit of the escaping Persians at Khaniqeen, 25 kilometres (15 mi) from Jalawla on the road to Iran, still under the command of Mihran. Qa'qa defeated the Persian forces in the Battle of Khaniqeen and captured the city. The Persians then withdrew to Hulwan. Qa'qa followed and laid siege to the city, which was captured in January 638. Qa'qa sought permission to operate deeper in Persia, but Umar rejected the proposal, writing in response:

Persian raids in Mesopotamia (638–641)
By February 638 there was a lull in the fighting on the Persian front. The Suwad, the Tigris valley, and the Euphrates valley were now under complete Muslim control. The Persians had withdrawn to Persia proper, east of the Zagros mountains. The Persians continued raiding Mesopotamia, which remained politically unstable. It seemed the Zagros range was the dividing line between the Rashidun Caliphate and the Sassanids. In the latter part of 638, Hormuzan, who was one of the seven great chiefs of Persia, and had commanded a corps at the Battle of Qadisiyyah, intensified his raids in Mesopotamia. Saad, on Umar's instructions, attacked Hormuzan, while Utbah ibn Ghazwan, aided by Nouman ibn Muqarin, attacked Ahvaz and forced Hormuzan into a peace treaty, under which Ahvaz would remain in Hormuzan's possession as a Muslim vassal state and would pay tribute. Hormuzan broke the treaty, leading Umar to send Abu Musa Ashaari, governor of Busra, to deal with him. After another defeat, Hormuzan signed another treaty on similar terms to the last. This peace also proved short-lived once Hormuzan was reinforced by fresh Persian troops sent by Emperor Yazdgerd III in late 640. The troops concentrated at Tuster, north of Ahvaz. Umar sent the Governor of Kufa, Ammar ibn Yasir, the governor of Busra, Abu Musa, and Nouman ibn Muqarin there, where Hormuzan was defeated, captured and sent to Umar in Medina.  Hormuzan apparently converted to Islam and remained a useful adviser to Umar throughout the remainder of the Persian campaign. He is also believed to be the mastermind behind Umar's assassination in 644.

After the victory at Tustar, Abu Musa marched against the strategically important Susa in January 641, capturing it after a siege of a couple of months. Next, Abu Musa marched against Junde Sabur, the only place left of military importance in the Persian province of Khuzistan, which surrendered to the Muslims after a siege of a few weeks.

Battle of Nahavand (642)

After the conquest of Khuzistan, Umar wanted peace. Though considerably weakened, the image of the Persian Empire as a fearsome superpower still resonated in the minds of the newly-ascendant Arabs, and Umar was wary of unnecessary military engagement with it, preferring to leave the rump of the Persian Empire alone, commenting, "I wish there was a mountain of fire between us and the Persians, so that neither they could get to us, nor we to them."
Persian pride was hurt by the Arab conquest, making the status quo intolerable.

After the defeat of the Persian forces at the Battle of Jalula in 637, Yazdgerd III went to Rey and from there moved to Merv, where he set up his capital and directed his chiefs to conduct continuous raids in Mesopotamia. Within four years, Yazdgerd III felt powerful enough to challenge the Muslims again for control of Mesopotamia. Accordingly, he recruited 100,000 hardened veterans and young volunteers from all parts of Persia, under the command of Mardan Shah, which marched to Nahavand for the last titanic struggle with the Caliphate.

The Governor of Kufa, Ammar ibn Yasir, received intelligence of the Persian movements and concentration at Nahavand and reported them to Umar. Although Umar had expressed a desire for Mesopotamia to be his easternmost frontier, the concentration of the Persian army at Nahavand forced him to act. He now believed that as long as Persia proper remained under Sasanian rule, the raids into Mesopotamia would continue. Hudheifa ibn Al Yaman was appointed commander of the forces of Kufa, and was ordered to march to Nahavand. Abu Musa was to march to Nahavand from Busra, while Nouman ibn Muqarrin marched from Ctesiphon. Umar decided to personally take the army concentrated at Medina to Nahavand to assume overall command. The members of the Majlis al-Shura suggested that Umar should command the campaign from Medina, appointing an astute field commander for Nahavand. Umar acquiesced, appointing Mugheera ibn Shuba as commander of the forces concentrated at Medina, and Nouman ibn Muqarrin as commander-in-chief at Nahavand. The Muslim army first concentrated at Tazar, and then defeated the Persians at the Battle of Nahavand in December 642. Nouman died in the action, and, as per Umar's instructions, Hudheifa ibn Al Yaman became the new commander-in-chief. Thereafter, the Muslims captured the whole district of Hamadan, encountering only feeble resistance.

Conquest of Persia (642–651)
After several years, Caliph Umar adopted a new offensive policy, preparing to launch a full-scale invasion of what remained of the Sasanian Empire. The Battle of Nahavand was one of the most decisive battles in Islamic history and proved to be the key to Persia. After the devastating defeat at Nahavand, the last Sassanid emperor, Yazdegerd III, fled to different parts of Persia to raise a new army, with limited success, while Umar attempted to capture him.

Strategic planning for the conquest of Persia
Umar decided to strike the Persians immediately after their defeat at Nahavand, while he still possessed a psychological advantage. Umar had to decide which of three provinces to conquer first: Fars in the south, Azerbaijan in the north or Isfahan in the center. Umar chose Isfahan, as it was the heart of the Persian Empire and a conduit for supply and communications among the Sasanian garrisons, and its capture would isolate Fars and Azerbaijan from Khorasan, Yazdegerd's stronghold. After he had taken Fars and Isfahan, the next attacks would be simultaneously launched against Azerbaijan, the northwestern province, and Sistan, the easternmost province of the Persian Empire. The conquest of those provinces would leave Khorasan isolated and vulnerable, the last stage of the conquest of Sassanid Persia.

Preparations were complete by January 642. The success of the plan depended upon how effectively Umar could coordinate these attacks from Medina, about 1500 kilometers from Persia, and upon the skill of his field commanders. Umar adopted a different approach to the command structure. Instead of appointing a single field commander to press the campaign, Umar appointed several commanders, each assigned a different mission. Once a commander's mission ended, he would become an ordinary soldier under the new field commander for the latter's mission. The purpose of this strategy was to allow commanders to mix with their soldiers and to remind them that they are like everyone else: command is only given to the most competent, and, once the battle is over, the commander returns to his previous position.

On the eve of the campaign, Umar, in order to boost morale, decided to reinstall Khalid as field commander, four years after his dismissal. Khalid's reputation as the conqueror of the Eastern Roman provinces demoralized the Persian commanders, most of whom had already been defeated by him during his conquest of Mesopotamia in 633. Before Umar could issue the reappointment order, Khalid died in Emesa.

Throughout the Persian campaign, Umar even appointed the commanders of the wings, the center and the cavalry of the army. Umar strictly instructed his commanders to consult him before making any decisive move in Persia. All the commanders, before starting their assigned campaigns, were instructed to send a detailed report of the geography and terrain of the region and the positions of the Persian garrisons, forts, cities and troops. Umar then would send them a detailed plan of how he wanted the region to be captured. Only the tactical issues were left to the field commanders to tackle in accordance with the situation they faced at their fronts. Umar appointed the best available and well-reputed commanders for the campaign.

Conquest of Central Iran

In the wake of Khalid's demise, Umar appointed Abdullah ibn Uthman as commander of the Muslim forces for the invasion of Isfahan. From Nahavand, Nu'man ibn Muqaarin marched to Hamadan, and then proceeded 370 kilometres (230 mi) southeast to the city of Isfahan, defeating a Sasanian army there. The Sassanian commander, Shahrvaraz Jadhuyih, along with another Sasanian general, was killed during the battle. Nu'man, reinforced by fresh troops from Busra and Kufa under the command of Abu Musa Ashaari and Ahnaf ibn Qais, then besieged the city. The siege continued for a few months before the city surrendered.

In 651, Nu'aym ibn Muqaarin, Nu'man's brother, marched northeast to Rey, Iran, about 320 kilometres (200 mi) from Hamadan, and laid siege to the city, which surrendered after fierce resistance. Nu'aym then marched 240 kilometres (150 mi) northeast toward Qom, which was captured without much resistance. This represented the boundary of the Isfahan region. Further northeast was Khurasan, and southeast lay Sistan. Meanwhile, Hamadan and Rey had rebelled. Umar sent Nu'aym, whose brother Nu'man had recently died, to Hamadan to crush the rebellion and clear Isfahan's western frontier. Nu'aym recaptured Hamadan after a bloody battle, and then proceeded to Rey. There too the Persians resisted but were defeated outside the fort, and the Muslims recaptured the city. The Persian citizens sued for peace, agreeing to pay the Jizya. From Rey, Nu'aym moved north to Tabaristan, south of the Caspian Sea. The ruler of Tabaristan then signed a peace treaty with the Caliphate.

Conquest of Fars

First Muslim invasion and the successful Sasanian counter-attack
The Muslim invasion of Fars began in 638/9, when the Rashidun governor of Bahrain, al-'Ala' ibn al-Hadrami, having defeated some rebellious Arab tribes, seized an island in the Persian Gulf. Although al-'Ala' and the rest of the Arabs had been ordered to not invade Fars or its surrounding islands, he and his men continued their raids into the province. Al-'Ala quickly prepared an army which he divided into three groups, one under al-Jarud ibn Mu'alla, the second under al-Sawwar ibn Hammam, and the third under Khulayd ibn al-Mundhir ibn Sawa.

When the first group entered Fars, it was quickly defeated and al-Jarud was killed. The same thing soon happened to the second group. Khulayd and the third group kept the defenders at bay, but were blocked from withdrawing to Bahrain by the Sasanians. Umar, having found out about al-'Ala's invasion of Fars, had him replaced with Sa'd ibn Abi Waqqas as governor. Umar then ordered Utbah ibn Ghazwan to send reinforcements to Khulayd. Once the reinforcements arrived, Khulayd and some of his men managed to withdraw to Bahrain, while the rest withdrew to Basra.

Second and last Muslim invasion
In ca. 643, Uthman ibn Abi al-As seized Bishapur, which signed a peace treaty.  In 644, al-'Ala' once again attacked Fars from Bahrain, reaching as far as Estakhr, until he was repulsed by the Persian governor (marzban) of Fars, Shahrag. Some time later, Uthman ibn Abi al-As managed to establish a military base at Tawwaj, and soon defeated and killed Shahrag near Rew-shahr. Persian convert to Islam, Hormoz ibn Hayyan al-'Abdi, was then sent by Uthman ibn Abi al-As to attack a fortress known as Senez on the coast of Fars. After the accession of Uthman ibn Affan as the new Rashidun Caliph on 11 November, the inhabitants of Bishapur, under the leadership of Shahrag's brother, declared independence, but were defeated. The Persian historian al-Baladhuri said this occurred in 646.

In 648, 'Abd-Allah ibn al-'Ash'ari forced the governor of Estakhr, Mahak, to surrender the city. Its citizens rebelled in 649/650 while its newly appointed governor, 'Abd-Allah ibn 'Amir, was trying to capture Gor. The military governor of Estakhr, 'Ubayd Allah ibn Ma'mar, was defeated and killed. In 650/651, Yazdegerd went there to plan an organized resistance against the Arabs, and, after some time, went to Gor. Estakhr put up a weak resistance and was soon sacked by the Arabs, who killed over 40,000 defenders. The Arabs then quickly seized Gor, Kazerun and Siraf, while Yazdegerd fled to Kerman. Muslim control of Fars remained shaky for a time, with several local rebellions following the conquest.

Conquest of Southeastern Persia (Kerman and Makran)

The expedition to Kerman, under Suhail ibn Adi, was sent at roughly the same time as the expeditions to Sistan and Azerbaijan. Suhail marched from Busra in 643; passing through Shiraz and Persepolis, he joined with other armies and then marched against Kerman, which was subdued after a pitched battle with the local garrisons.

Conquest of Sakastan

The Arabs were raiding Sakastan as early as Umar's caliphate. The first real invasion took place in 650, when Abd-Allah ibn Amir, having secured his position in Kerman, sent an army under Mujashi ibn Mas'ud there. After crossing the Dasht-i Lut desert, Mujashi ibn Mas'ud reached Sakastan, but suffered a heavy defeat and was forced to retreat.

One year later, Abd-Allah ibn Amir sent an army under Rabi ibn Ziyad Harithi to Sakastan. After some time, Rabi reached Zaliq, a Sakastani border town, where he forced the dehqan of the town to acknowledge Rashidun authority.  He then did the same at the fortress of Karkuya, which had a famous fire temple mentioned in the Tarikh-i Sistan. He then seized more land in the province. Next, he besieged the provincial capital, Zrang, and, after a heavy battle outside the city, its governor, Aparviz, surrendered. When Aparviz went to Rabi ibn Ziyad to negotiate a treaty, he saw that Rabi was using the bodies of two dead soldiers as a chair. This horrified Aparviz, who, in order to spare the inhabitants of Sakastan from the Arabs, made peace with them in return for a heavy tribute of 1 million dirhams, including 1,000 slave boys (or girls) bearing 1,000 golden vessels. Rabi ibn Ziyad was then appointed governor of the province.

Eighteen months later, Rabi was summoned to Basra, and was replaced by 'Abd al-Rahman ibn Samura. The inhabitants of Sakastan used this opportunity to rebel, defeating the Muslim garrison at Zrang. When 'Abd al-Rahman ibn Samura reached Sakastan, he suppressed the rebellion and defeated the Zunbils of Zabulistan, seizing Bust and a few cities in Zabulistan.

Conquest of Iranian Azerbaijan

The conquest of Iranian Azerbaijan started in 651, part of a simultaneous attack launched against Kerman and Makran in the southeast (described above), against Sistan in the northeast and against Azerbaijan in the northwest. Hudheifa ibn Al Yaman was assigned Azerbaijan. Hudheifa marched from Rey in central Persia to Zanjan, a well-fortified Persian stronghold in the north. The Persians came out of the city and gave battle, but Hudheifa defeated them, captured the city, and those who sought peace were granted it on the usual jizya conditions. From Zanjan, Hudheifa marched to Ardabil which surrendered peacefully. Hudheifa then continued his march north along the western coast of the Caspian Sea and captured Bab al-Abwab by force. At this point Hudheifa was recalled by Uthman, to be replaced by Bukair ibn Abdullah and Utba ibn Farqad. They were sent to carry out a two-pronged attack against Azerbaijan: Bukair along the western coast of the Caspian Sea, and Uthba into the heart of Azerbaijan. On his way north Bukair was halted by a large Persian force under Isfandiyar, the son of Farrukhzad. A pitched battle was fought, after which Isfandiyar was defeated and captured. In return for his life, he agreed to surrender his estates in Azerbaijan and persuade others to submit to Muslim rule. Uthba ibn Farqad then defeated Bahram, brother of Isfandiyar. He too sued for peace. Azerbaijan then surrendered to Caliph Umar, agreeing to pay the annual jizya.

Conquest of Armenia

The Muslims had conquered Byzantine Armenia in 638–639. Armenia, remained in Persian hands, along with Khurasan. Umar refused to take any chances; he did not consider the Persians weak, which facilitated the speedy conquest of the Persian Empire. Again Umar sent simultaneous expeditions to the far north-east and north-west of the Persian Empire, one to Khurasan in late 643 and the other to Armenia.
Bukair ibn Abdullah was ordered to capture Tiflis. From Bab, on the western coast of the Caspian Sea, Bukair continued his march north. Umar employed his traditional successful strategy of multi-pronged attacks. While Bukair was still kilometres away from Tiflis, Umar instructed him to divide his army into three corps. Umar appointed Habib ibn Muslaima to capture Tiflis, Abdulrehman to march north against the mountains and Hudheifa to march against the southern mountains. With the success of all three missions, the advance into Armenia came to an end with the death of Umar in November 644. By then almost the whole of the South Caucasus was captured.

Conquest of Khorasan

Khorasan was the second-largest province of the Sasanian Empire. It stretched from what is now northeastern Iran, northwestern Afghanistan and southern Turkmenistan. In 651 the conquest of Khurasan was assigned to Ahnaf ibn Qais. Ahnaf marched from Kufa and took a short and less frequented route via Rey and Nishapur. Rey was already in Muslim hands and Nishapur surrendered without resistance. From Nishapur, Ahnaf marched to Herat in western Afghanistan. Herat was a fortified town, and the resulting siege lasted for a few months before it surrendered, bringing the whole of southern Khorasan under Muslim control. Ahnaf then marched north directly to Merv, in present-day Turkmenistan. Merv was the capital of Khurasan and here Yazdegred III held his court. On hearing of the Muslim advance, Yazdegerd III left for Balkh. No resistance was offered at Merv, and the Muslims occupied the capital of Khurasan without a fight. Ahnaf stayed at Merv and waited for reinforcement from Kufa. Meanwhile, Yazdegerd had also gathered considerable power at Balkh and allied with the Turkic Khan of Farghana, who personally led the relief contingent. Umar ordered Ahnaf to break up the alliance. The Khan of Farghana, realizing that fighting against the Muslims might endanger his own kingdom, withdrew from the alliance and pulled back to Farghana. The remainder of Yazdegerd's army was defeated at the Battle of Oxus River and retreated across the Oxus to Transoxiana. Yazdegerd himself narrowly escaped to China.The Muslims had now reached the outermost frontiers of Persia. Beyond that lay the lands of the Turks and still further lay China. Ahnaf returned to Merv and sent a detailed report of his success to the anxiously-waiting Umar, and sought permission to cross the Oxus river and invade Transoxiana. Umar ordered Ahnaf to stand down and instead consolidate his power south of the Oxus.

Persian rebellion and reconquest
Umar was assassinated in November 644 by a Persian slave named Abu Lu'lu'a Firuz, after having refused to lift a tax imposed upon the latter. Soon after, Abu Lu'lu'a's was either executed or committed suicide. In retaliation, Ubayd Allah ibn Umar (one of Umar's sons) killed Abu Lu'lu'a's daughter, and declared his intention to kill all non-Arabs residing in Medina. Acting upon a claim that they had been seen conspiring with Abu Lu'lu'a while he was holding the murder weapon, Ubayd Allah killed Hurmuzān, an ex-Sasanian military officer who had been working for Umar as an adviser after his capture by the Muslims, and Jufayna, a Christian man from al-Hira (Iraq) who had been taken to Medina to serve as a tutor. Just like Abu Lu'lu'a's assassination of Umar over something as trivial as a tax burden, Ubayd Allah's retaliatory killing of apparently random non-Arabs bears witness to the strong tensions that existed between Arabs and non-Arabs in the early Islamic caliphate.

Uthman ibn Affan (644–656) succeeded Umar as caliph. During his reign, almost the whole of the former Sassanid empire's territory rebelled from time to time, requiring him to send several military expeditions to crush the rebellions and recapture Persia and its vassal states. The main rebellions were in the Persian provinces of Armenia, Azerbaijan, Fars, Sistan (in 649), Khorasan (651), and Makran (650). Finally, in 651, Yazdegerd III, the last Sassanid emperor, was killed near Merv by a local miller for his purse, thus putting an end to both his dynasty and to organized Persian resistance. Meanwhile, Uthman's empire expanded beyond the borders of the Sasanian Empire, to Transoxiana, Baluchistan, and the Caucasus. For many decades to come, this was the easternmost limit of Muslim rule.

Persia under Muslim rule

According to Bernard Lewis:

Arab Muslims conquests have been variously seen in Iran: by some as a blessing, the advent of the true faith, the end of the age of ignorance and heathenism; by others as a humiliating national defeat, the conquest and subjugation of the country by foreign invaders. Both perceptions are of course valid, depending on one's angle of vision... Iran was indeed Islamized, but it was not Arabized. Persians remained Persians. And after an interval of silence, Iran reemerged as a separate, different and distinctive element within Islam, eventually adding a new element even to Islam itself. Culturally, politically, and most remarkable of all even religiously, the Iranian contribution to this new Islamic civilization is of immense importance. The work of Iranians can be seen in every field of cultural endeavor, including Arabic poetry, to which poets of Iranian origin composing their poems in Arabic made a very significant contribution. In a sense, Iranian Islam is a second advent of Islam itself, a new Islam sometimes referred to as Islam-i Ajam. It was this Persian Islam, rather than the original Arab Islam, that was brought to new areas and new peoples: to the Turks, first in Central Asia and then in the Middle East in the country which came to be called Turkey, and of course to India. The Ottoman Turks brought a form of Iranian civilization to the walls of Vienna.

Administration

Under Umar and his immediate successors, the Arab conquerors attempted to maintain their political and cultural cohesion despite the attractions of the civilizations they had conquered. The Arabs initially settled in the garrison towns rather than on scattered estates.

The new non-Muslim subjects were protected by the state and known as dhimmi (protected), and were to pay a special tax, the jizya (tribute), which was calculated at varying individual rates, usually two dirhams for able-bodied men of military age, in return for exemption from military service. Women and children were exempted from the jizya.
Mass conversions were neither desired nor allowed, at least in the first few centuries of Arab rule.

Umar is reported to have issued the following instructions about the protected people: "Make it easy for him, who can not pay tribute; help him who is weak, let them keep their titles, but do not give them our kuniyat [Arabic traditional nicknames or titles]."
Umar's liberal policies were continued by at least his immediate successors. In his dying charge to Uthman, he is reported to have said, "I charge the caliph after me to be kind to the dhimmis, to keep their covenant, to protect them and not to burden them over their strength."
As a matter of practicality, the jizya replaced the Sasanian poll taxes, which tended to be much higher than the jizya. In addition to the jizya, the old Sasanian land tax (known in Arabic as Kharaj) was also adopted. Umar is said to have occasionally set up commissions to survey tax burdens in order to ensure that they wouldn't be more than the land could bear. It is reported that Zoroastrians were subjected to humiliation and ridicule when paying the jizya in order to make them feel inferior.

At least under the Rashiduns and early Ummayads, the administrative system of the late Sasanian period was largely retained: a pyramidal system where each quarter of the state was divided into provinces, the provinces into districts, and the districts into sub-districts.  Provinces were called ustan (Middle Persian ostan), and the districts shahrs, centered upon a district capital known as a shahristan. The subdistricts were called tasok in Middle Persian, which was adopted into Arabic as tassuj (plural tasasij).

Religion

Zoroastrians were made to pay an extra tax called jizya, or be killed, enslaved or imprisoned. Those paying jizya were subjected to insults and humiliation by the tax collectors. Zoroastrians who were captured as slaves in wars were given their freedom if they converted to Islam. While giving freedom of choice, the Arab conquerors designated privileges for those who converted to Islam. The conversion process was slow and uncompleted, stretching over many centuries, with a majority of Persians still following Zoroastrianism at the turn of the millennium.

Muslim leaders in their effort to win converts encouraged attendance at Muslim prayer with promises of money and allowed the Quran to be recited in Persian instead of Arabic so that it would be intelligible to all. Islam was readily accepted by Zoroastrians who were employed in industrial and artisan positions because, according to Zoroastrian dogma, such occupations that involved defiling fire made them impure. Moreover, Muslim missionaries did not encounter difficulty in explaining Islamic tenets to Zoroastrians, as there were many similarities between the faiths. According to Thomas Walker Arnold, the Persian would meet Ahura Mazda and Ahriman under the names of Allah and Iblis. In Afghanistan, Islam was spread due to Umayyad missionary efforts particularly under the reign of Hisham ibn Abd al-Malik and Umar ibn Abd al-Aziz.

There were also large and thriving Christian and Jewish communities, along with smaller numbers of Buddhists and other groups. The population moved slowly and steadily toward Islam. The nobility and citizens converted first. Islam spread more slowly among the peasantry and the dihqans, or landed gentry. By the late 10th century, the majority of the Persians had become Muslim.

Until the 15th century, most Persian Muslims were Sunni Muslims, though with rise of Safavids in early 16th century and their forced conversion of Sunnis lead to rise of Shi'a Muslim faith in Iran.

Language of Persia
During the Rashidun Caliphate, the official language of Persia (including Mesopotamia) remained Middle Persian (Pahlavi), just as the official languages of Syria and Egypt remained Greek and Coptic. During the Umayyad Caliphate, the Ummayads made Arabic the primary language of their subjected people throughout their empire, displacing their indigenous languages. Particularly, Al-Hajjaj ibn Yusuf (661–714) officially changed the administrative language of Iraq from Middle Persian (Pahlavi) to Arabic. Although an area from Iraq to Morocco speaks Arabic-based dialects to this day, Middle Persian proved to be much more enduring. Most of its structure and vocabulary survived, evolving into New Persian. Persian incorporated a certain amount of Arabic vocabulary, especially words pertaining to religion, and it switched from the Pahlavi scripts to a modified version of the Arabic alphabet. Today Persian is spoken officially in Iran, Afghanistan, and Tajikistan.

Urbanisation
The Arab conquest of Persia led to a period of extreme urbanisation in Iran, starting with the ascension of the Abbasid dynasty and ending in the 11th century CE. This was particularly true for the eastern parts of the country, for regions like Khorasan and Transoxiana. During this period, Iran saw the development of massive metropolises, some reaching population numbers of up to 200,000 people. This period of extreme urbanisation was followed in the late 11th and early 12th century by a collapse of the Iranian economy, which led to large scale emigrations of Iranians into Central Asia, India, the rest of the Middle East, and Anatolia. This catastrophe has been cited by some as reason for the Persian language becoming widespread throughout Central Asia and large parts of the Middle East.

See also

References

Sources

External links

 History of Iran: Islamic Conquest from the Iran Chamber Society.
 The Arab conquests at History World.
 Muslim Conquest of Persia at Mecca Books.

 
 
History of Western Asia
Invasions of Iran
7th century in Iran
Sasanian